Marcel Deleeuw was a football player in the Canadian Football League for three years, mostly serving as a punter.

After playing junior football for the Edmonton Wildcats, Marcel Deleeuw joined the Edmonton Eskimos in 1964 as their regular punter, replacing Aubrey Linne. Deleeuw punted for a 38.0 average and no single point. However, the following year he was replaced as the punter and mostly served as a punt returner. He only came back in 1971 as the punter of the Ottawa Rough Riders when his average increased to 42.5 yards per punt. However, he did not play another season.

References

Living people
Dutch emigrants to Canada
Dutch players of Canadian football
Edmonton Elks players
Ottawa Rough Riders players
Canadian football defensive backs
Canadian football running backs
Canadian football punters
Year of birth missing (living people)